Thomas Durham was launched in 1813 in Bermuda. She was wrecked in 1821.

Thomas Durham first appeared in Lloyd's Register (LR), in 1820.

Fate: On 5 November 1820 Thomas Durham arrived at the Cape from Algoa Bay. On 14 January 1821 a storm tore Thomas Durham from her moorings in Mossel Bay, South Africa. She was wrecked with the loss of all on board. Captain J[ames] Chissell, having gone ashore, was the only survivor; it was expected that little of her cargo could be saved. She had come from "The Knysus".

Citations and references
Citations

References
 

1813 ships
Ships built in Bermuda
Age of Sail merchant ships of England
Maritime incidents in January 1821